This is a list of multilateral treaties administered by the Council of Europe, known as the  Council of Europe Treaty Series (CETS). As of July 2016, there are 220 Council of Europe treaties.

References
"Complete list of the Council of Europe's treaties", coe.int.

Lists of treaties